Canal 11 (Spanish and Portuguese for Channel 11) can refer to:

 Canal 11 (Argentina), an Argentinian television channel
 Canal 11 (Honduras), a Honduran television channel
 Canal 11 (Portugal), a Portuguese television channel
 Canal 11 Televisión, a former Venezuelan television channel
 Canal Once (Mexico), a Mexican television channel
 Repretel 11, a Costa Rican television channel